USS Macon has been the name of more than one United States Navy ship or airship, and may refer to:
, an airship commissioned in 1933 and destroyed in a crash in 1935
, a planned patrol frigate cancelled in 1943
, a  heavy cruiser commissioned in 1945 and struck in 1969

See also 
 

United States Navy ship names